Susan Hyde is an American political scientist. She is Professor of Political Science at University of California, Berkeley. Her research focuses on international influences on domestic politics.

Her 2011 book, The Pseudo-Democrat's Dilemma: Why Election Observation Became an International Norm, won the International Studies Association's 2012 Chadwick Alger Prize, as well as the 2012 best book award by APSA's Comparative Democratization Section. She was awarded the 2019 Karl Deutsch Award by the International Studies Association.

She obtained her Ph.D. from the University of California, San Diego in 2006.

References 

International relations scholars
American women political scientists
American political scientists
Living people
Year of birth missing (living people)
University of California, San Diego alumni
University of California, Berkeley faculty
21st-century American women